Steve "Stevie" Gibbons (born 27 September 1983) is an Irish professional rugby league footballer who played in the 2000s. He played at representative level for Ireland, and at club level for Carlow Crusaders, Oldham (Heritage No. and London Skolars in National League Two.

Background
Gibbons was born in Dublin, Ireland. He is the son of former Irish senator Jim Gibbons, grandson of former TD and government minister Jim Gibbons Snr. and brother of prominent international DJ and music producer John Gibbons.

International honours
Steve Gibbons was named in the Ireland training squad for the 2008 Rugby League World Cup, and the Ireland squad for the 2008 Rugby League World Cup.

Gibbons won caps for Ireland while at Carlow Crusaders 2006–2007 1-cap + 3-caps (sub).

References

External links
Ireland profile
Ireland line up Richards for World Cup duty
Ireland 58-18 Russia
Wales A 10 Ireland A 24
Ireland 18-18 Lebanon

1983 births
Living people
Carlow Crusaders players
Expatriate rugby league players in England
Ireland national rugby league team players
Irish expatriate rugby league players
Irish expatriate sportspeople in England
Irish rugby league players
London Skolars players
Oldham R.L.F.C. players
Sportspeople from Dublin (city)
Rugby league players from County Dublin